
Gmina Ustronie Morskie is a rural gmina (administrative district) in Kołobrzeg County, West Pomeranian Voivodeship, in north-western Poland.

Villages
Gmina Ustronie Morskie contains the villages and settlements of Bagicz, Grąbnica, Gwizd, Jaromierzyce, Kukinia, Kukinka, Malechowo, Olszyna, Rusowo, Sianożęty, Ustronie Morskie and Wieniotowo.

Neighbouring gminas
Gmina Ustronie Morskie is bordered by the gminas of Będzino, Dygowo and Kołobrzeg.

References
Polish official population figures 2006

Ustronie Morskie
Kołobrzeg County